Márcio Passos de Albuquerque (born 6 September 1978), known as Emerson Sheik or just Emerson, is a Qatari-Brazilian former professional footballer who played as a forward.

Club career

Early career
Emerson Sheik was born in Nova Iguaçu, Brazil. As a promising teenager, he developed in São Paulo FC's youth system. He made his senior side debut in 1998.

Japan
Emerson Sheik went to Japan to join Consadole Sapporo of the second division, for whom he scored 31 goals in 34 games during the 2000 season. After the season, he joined another second division team, Kawasaki Frontale, with whom he continued his goal-scoring domination, registering 19 goals in 18 league games. In the middle of the 2001 season, however, he left Frontale to join the first division Urawa Reds, for whom he has yet again excelled. He scored 71 league goals in 100 appearances for the Reds and won 2003 J1 League top scorer and 2004 J1 League MVP.

Al-Sadd
Emerson Sheik later joined Qatar outfit Al-Sadd with the transfer fee of 8 million US dollars in 2005.

Move to France
On 25 August 2007, Emerson Sheik signed a three-year contract with French side Stade Rennais FC.

Return to Al-Sadd
Emerson Sheik could not break into the first team at Rennes. Meanwhile, his previous team Al-Sadd were going through a lean phase. They had many bad results and were 14 points behind unbeaten leaders Al-Gharafa by the end of 2007. Their new import Mauro Zárate did not link up nicely with Emerson's ex-striking partner, Carlos Tenorio up front. The fans of Al-Sadd started rooting for the return of Emerson. So Al-Sadd started negotiations with Emerson in December and on 19 December, the club's official website announced Emerson's return.

Flamengo
On 20 March 2009, the former São Paulo FC and Rennes forward signed a season-long deal with childhood favorite Flamengo; the 30-year-old was a free agent after leaving Al-Sadd. He generally kept a good scoring record for the club, which long sought a competent striker before his arrival. In the Série A 2009 season, his partnership with Adriano was one of the league's most effective forward lines. Club legend Andrade praised both players' performance.

Al Ain FC
On 5 September 2009, he signed a two-year deal with Al Ain FC. He was presented to the press on 6 September 2009 and was handed a number eight shirt.

Fluminense
On 16 June 2010, Emerson Sheik signed for Fluminense Football Club. On 5 December 2010, Emerson scored the winning goal for Fluminense to conquer the 1st division Brazilian title, making him Brazilian champion two years in a row.

Sport Club Corinthians Paulista
On 18 May 2011, Emerson Sheik signed for Sport Club Corinthians Paulista. On 4 December 2011, he won his third Brazilian championship in a row with Corinthians, making him the first player in history to win three straight Brazilian championships with three different teams.
On 4 July 2012, Emerson scored two goals in the second match of the 2012 Copa Libertadores Finals, helping Corinthians to win their first Copa Libertadores. On 16 December 2012, he was part of the Corinthians team which won the FIFA World Club Championship, beating Chelsea 1–0. In the last few minutes of the game, he was involved in an off-the-ball incident with Gary Cahill, in which Emerson fell to the ground holding his face. Cahill received a red card, but the Englishman claimed Emerson fouled him first before diving.

In an interview for Esporte Espetacular, an attraction of Rede Globo, Emerson showed his dislike for Mano Menezes, coach of the club. Emerson Sheik told reporters: "I do not wanna work with him [Mano] anymore." Still, according to the former corintiano: "I think he [Mano] is a very limited coach. I did not see anything special in him, and I do not think he will improve, because he does not have the humility to ask something."

Emerson Sheik returned to Corinthians in 2015 as Tite returned to the club as the new manager. He was a first choice for many of the first games of the season, including the 2015 Copa Libertadores. After Corinthians was eliminated in the Round of 16, the club opted against renegotiating Emerson's contract, due to end in 31 July of the same year. He was released on 12 June, after both sides reached an agreement on the matter.

Botafogo
In April 2014, he was loaned to Botafogo, his third club in Rio de Janeiro, Brazil. He took the shirt number seven, used before by Botafogo's biggest idol, Garrincha.

International career
Emerson Sheik played 1999 South American Youth Championship for U-20 Brazil, while he was still known as aged 18 instead of 21. He was offered Qatari citizenship by Al-Sadd so that they could accommodate one more foreign player in their line-up. He accepted and he became a Qatari citizen in 2008. He made his international debut for the Qatar national team on 4 March 2008 in a friendly against Bahrain. He also played the next friendly, vs. Jordan, on 16 March and a World Cup qualifying match, vs. Iraq, on 26 March.

In April 2008, it was revealed that Emerson Sheik had also played for the Brazil under-20 team which makes him ineligible to play for the Qatari national team. Taking that into consideration, and that he represented Qatar in the World Cup qualifier against Iraq on 26 March, Qatar breached the FIFA rules, and Qatar could have lost the three points they gained from the game against Iraq. FIFA confirmed the breach of laws but said that QFA is not responsible for any wrongdoing, and that Emerson has since not played for Qatar. Although FIFA has loosened the nationality transfer of uncapped players and players with multi-nationality, it was not beneficial to Emerson, because he did not hold multi-nationality when representing Brazil.

Controversy
Emerson Sheik was detained by the Brazilian federal police on his way back to Qatar on 20 January 2006 for allegedly falsifying a birth certificate to show that he was three years younger than his actual age. The fake birth certificate, which was used to issue his passport, said that he was born on 6 December 1981 in Nova Iguaçu with the name "Márcio Emerson Passos", but his original shows he was born 6 September 1978, with the name "Márcio Passos de Albuquerque".

Kiss issue
On 18 August 2013, after the 1–0 victory by Corinthians against Coritiba FC in the Brazilian League, Emerson Sheik celebrated the alvinegro triumph by kissing his friend and posting the photo on Instagram.

On 19 August, one day after the incident, homophobic Corinthians supporters protested against the kiss at Joaquim Grava Training Center where Corinthians were undertaking a training session. Emerson Sheik called the protests an "idiotic prejudice".

On 21 August, in the first game after the incident, a 1–0 loss against Luverdense in the 2013 Copa do Brasil, Emerson Sheik was sent off along with opposition player Zé Roberto after they argued on field. Speaking to the press after the game, Zé Roberto in reference to Emerson, said: "I am not the guy that takes a kiss from anyone, I do not accept this kind of thing."

Career statistics

Club

FIFA Club World Cup

* Friendly

International

Honors

Club
Consadole Sapporo
J2 League: 2000

Urawa Red Diamonds
J.League Cup: 2003

Al Ain FC
UAE Super Cup: 2009

Flamengo
Campeonato Brasileiro Série A: 2009
Campeonato Carioca: 2009
Taça Rio: 2009

Fluminense
Campeonato Brasileiro Série A: 2010

Corinthians
Campeonato Brasileiro Série A: 2011, 2015
Campeonato Paulista: 2013, 2018
Copa Libertadores: 2012
Recopa Sudamericana: 2013
FIFA Club World Cup: 2012

Individual
 J.League MVP Award: 2003
 J.League Top Scorer: 2004
 J.League Best XI: 2002, 2003, 2004
 Qatar National First Division MVP: 2006
 Copa Libertadores: 2012 Best Player

References

External links
 Márcio Passos de Albuquerque's profile, stats & pics
 
 
 
 

São Paulo FC players
Hokkaido Consadole Sapporo players
Kawasaki Frontale players
Urawa Red Diamonds players
Campeonato Brasileiro Série A players
Ligue 1 players
Stade Rennais F.C. players
CR Flamengo footballers
Al Sadd SC players
Fluminense FC players
Sport Club Corinthians Paulista players
Botafogo de Futebol e Regatas players
J1 League Player of the Year winners
J1 League players
J2 League players
Qatar Stars League players
UAE Pro League players
Copa Libertadores-winning players
Expatriate footballers in Japan
Expatriate footballers in France
Brazilian expatriate sportspeople in the United Arab Emirates
Qatar international footballers
Qatari footballers
Qatari expatriate sportspeople in Japan
Brazilian emigrants to Qatar
Brazilian expatriate footballers
Brazilian footballers
Naturalised citizens of Qatar
People from Nova Iguaçu
1978 births
Living people
Qatari expatriate footballers
Qatari people of Brazilian descent
Association football forwards
Association football midfielders
Association football wingers
Sportspeople from Rio de Janeiro (state)